The British Institute at Ankara (BIAA), formerly British Institute of Archaeology at Ankara, is a research institute that supports, promotes, and publishes research into the humanities and social sciences of Turkey and the Black Sea region. The institute was founded in 1947 and became legally incorporated in 1956 as part of a cultural agreement between the Republic of Turkey and the United Kingdom. The institute is a UK registered charity and part of the British Academy's Overseas Institutes. The institute has an office in based in Ankara, where it maintains a library, research facilities, and accommodation for visiting scholars. It also has a London office.

Archaeologist Lutgarde Vandeput is the current director of the BIAA.

In addition to funding the publication of research monographs on archaeology and the history of Turkey, the institute regularly publishes the journal Anatolian Studies and the annual magazine Heritage Turkey.

By the decision of the Turkish government, all scholars from the United Kingdom wishing to do archeological research in Turkey must channel their permit applications through the British Institute in Ankara.

History 
The BIAA was founded on 22 November 1947 after proposals by the British archaeologist John Garstang, who became the institute's first director. He was instrumental in choosing Ankara as the location of the new institute, in contrast to similar existing organizations that were based in Istanbul. Other founding members included the archaeologist and museum curator Winifred Lamb, who served as honorary secretary from the organisation's foundation until 1956, whereupon she became vice-president.

The institute's journal, Anatolian Studies, was first published in 1951, becoming a key reference for all archaeology-related disciplines in the region.

Seton Lloyd succeeded Garstang as director in 1949, In 1961, Michael Gough became the institute's third director. He had a focus on the Byzantine period, with excavations at the church complex at Alahan and at Dağ Pazarı. James Mellaart, as assistant director from 1957 to 1961, started excavations at the site of Çatalhöyük, identifying it as a unique Neolithic settlement. David French became the institute's fourth director in 1968. In 1993 French retired and in 1995 Roger Mathews became the 5th director. Hugh Elton, who was appointed as the director in 2001, changed the name of the British Institute of Archaeology to British Institute. The current director is Lutgarde Vandeput, who became director in 2006.
British archaeologist Shahina Farid is honorary secretary.

References 

British overseas research institutes
Archaeological organizations